The Lily of the Tenements is a 1911 American short silent drama film directed by D. W. Griffith, starring Clara T. Bracy and featuring Blanche Sweet.

Cast
 Dorothy West as The Tenement Girl
 Clara T. Bracy as The Tenement Girl's Mother
 W. Chrystie Miller as The Tenement Girl's Father
 George Nichols as Tenement Owner
 William J. Butler as One of the Father's Friends
 Donald Crisp
 Francis J. Grandon as The Doctor
 Arthur V. Johnson
 Adolph Lestina as One of the Father's Friends
 Owen Moore
 Alfred Paget as a Customer
 W. C. Robinson as the Butler
 Blanche Sweet

See also
 D. W. Griffith filmography
 Blanche Sweet filmography

References

External links

1911 films
1911 short films
American silent short films
Biograph Company films
American black-and-white films
1911 drama films
Films directed by D. W. Griffith
Silent American drama films
1910s American films